Bovenkerk is a village in the municipality of Krimpenerwaard in the province of South Holland, Netherlands. Bovenkerk was part of the municipality of Vlist until 1 January 2015, when it was absorbed in the newly-formed municipality of Krimpenerwaard. It lies east of the town of Stolwijk, about 7 km (4.3 mi) southeast of Gouda.

Population
The statistical area of Bovenkerk, which also can include the surrounding countryside, has a population of around 245.

References

Populated places in South Holland
Krimpenerwaard